Halishahar Cantonment Public School & College is an institution situated at Halishahar Thana in Chittagong. It was established in 2013. The institution is run by Bangladesh Army. The current principal of the institution is Lt Col Md Shamsul Alam Siddique, psc.

Extra-eurricular activities 
Beside study, the students of this institution practice various types of games, recites poem, debate, music etc. The annual sport also held every year.

References 

Schools in Chittagong
Educational Institutions affiliated with Bangladesh Army